Konstantin Yuryevich Bogomolov (born July 23, 1975) is a Russian theater director, poet, and actor. He is the son of the film critic . He has been honoured with a Golden Mask Award.

Career

Poetry 
In 1990, Bogomolov's poems were published in the literary magazine We and the poetry collection Seventeenth Echo, in 1995 in the almanac Babylon. In 2019, with the book Thus Spoke Bogomolov (AST), the author was included in the short-list of the Andrei Bely Prize in the category poetry.

Directing
Bogomolov was Andrey Goncharov's student at the Russian Institute of Theatre Arts. Until November 2013, he served as Assistant Artistic Director of the Chekhov Moscow Art Theater. In 2014 he became a staff director of the Lenkom. Since 2012 he has been a teacher at the Moscow School of New Cinema.

At the end of May 2019, it was announced that Konstantin Bogomolov would be appointed artistic director of the Moscow Drama Theater on Malaya Bronnaya. On June 25, 2019, he took up this position.

In 2019 he directed tv series Gold Diggers, starring his ex-wife Darya Moroz.

Political views 
In 2018, he was the confidant of the candidate for mayor of Moscow Sergey Sobyanin.

Rape of Europa 2.0 
In February 2021, he published the Rape of Europe 2.0 manifesto in Novaya Gazeta, in which he criticized the New Ethics, and stated that Europe was in a deep ethical crisis, urging Russia to stop focusing on European values. The author's text says that Europe is turning into a new ethical Reich, the standards of which are developed under the influence of queer activists, fem-fanatics and ecopsychopaths. Bogomolov urged to build a new right-wing ideology outside of radical orthodoxy, but strictly and irreconcilably defending the values ​​of a complex world based on a complex person.

The manifesto sparked polar reactions among the Russian public.

Personal life 
Bogomolov's first wife was the actress Darya Moroz. The couple divorced in 2018. They have a daughter named Anna. His second wife is the journalist Ksenia Sobchak.

Bogomolov is the stepfather of Sobchak's only child, Platon, (born 2016).

References

External links 

 «Временно доступен», ТВЦ, гость — Константин Богомолов. 
 Блог Константина Богомолова на сайте «Эха Москвы»

1975 births
Living people
Writers from Moscow
Russian theatre directors
Russian male poets
Russian-language poets
20th-century Russian poets
21st-century Russian poets
Russian Academy of Theatre Arts alumni
Russian male film actors
Russian male television actors
Moscow State University alumni
Russian activists against the 2022 Russian invasion of Ukraine
Russian music video directors
Theatre people from Moscow